Tepeuxila Cuicatec is a language spoken in Oaxaca State, Mexico.

Notes 

Indigenous languages of Mexico
Mixtecan languages